Joseph Dennis may refer to:

 Joseph Dennis (cricketer) (1778–1831), English cricketer
 Joseph Dennis (mathematician) (1905–1977), American mathematician